Sacalum Municipality (In the Yucatec Maya Language: “white earth") is one of the 106 municipalities in the Mexican state of Yucatán containing (205.66 km2) of land and is located roughly 75 km south of the city of Mérida.

History
There is no accurate data on when the town was founded, but during the conquest, a Franciscan order settled here. At colonization, Sacalum became part of the encomienda system  with a series of encomendaros: Pedro Alvarez 1549, Francisco Pacheco 1579, Francisco de Solís 1607, Ignacio de Solís Osorio 1688, Lucas de Villamil y Vargas 1694.

Yucatán declared its independence from the Spanish Crown in 1821, and in 1825 the area was assigned to the low sierra partition of Mama Municipality. In 1867 it was transferred to the Ticul Municipality and confirmed as its own municipality in 1988.

Governance
The municipal president is elected for a three-year term. The town council has four councilpersons, who serve as Secretary and councilors of public security and public lighting, image and ecology, potable water, cemeteries, and police commissaries.

The Municipal Council administers the business of the municipality. It is responsible for budgeting and expenditures and producing all required reports for all branches of the municipal administration. Annually it determines educational standards for schools.

The Police Commissioners ensure public order and safety. They are tasked with enforcing regulations, distributing materials and administering rulings of general compliance issued by the council.

Communities
The head of the municipality is Sacalum, Yucatán. There are 9 populated areas of the municipality including: Chacá, Plan Chac, San Antonio Mulix, San Antonio Sodzil, San Esteban, San Raúl, Tepakán, Yohkat and Yunkú. The significant populations are shown below:

Local festivals
Every year on 3 May the town celebrates a festival in honor of the Holy Cross.

Tourist attractions
 Church of Saint Anthony of Padua, built in the eighteenth century
 Hacienda San Antonio Sodzil

References

Municipalities of Yucatán